The pava is a straw hat made out of the leaves of the Puerto Rican hat palm. It is normally associated with the Puerto Rican jíbaro and with the Popular Democratic Party (PPD).

Gallery

See also
 Panama hat

References

External links
Las pavas y su historia artesanal en Puerto Rico 

National symbols of Puerto Rico
Puerto Rican culture
Hats
Popular Democratic Party (Puerto Rico)